The following is a list of notable deaths in April 1990.

Entries for each day are listed alphabetically by surname. A typical entry lists information in the following sequence:
 Name, age, country of citizenship at birth, subsequent country of citizenship (if applicable), reason for notability, cause of death (if known), and reference.

April 1990

1
Benito Díaz, 91, Spanish footballer.
Lillian Miller, 92, American television personality.
Vince Pacewic, 69, American football player.
Carlos Peucelle, 81, Argentine footballer.
Bracha Tzfira, 79, Israeli musician and actress.
Charles Spain Verral, 85, Canadian author.
Russell Vis, 89, American wrestler.

2
Rafael Lorente de No, 87, Spanish neuroscientist.
Aldo Fabrizi, 84, Italian actor and film director.
Vanda Godsell, 67, English actress.
Peter Jones, 60, British broadcaster.
John Milton Roberts, 73, American anthropologist.

3
Edward Carlson, 78, American businessman, cancer.
Arthur Houghton, 83, American industrialist.
Clair Huffaker, 63, American screenwriter.
Willie Musarurwa, 62, Zimbabwean journalist.
Sloan Nibley, 81, American screenwriter.
Sarah Vaughan, 66, American singer, lung cancer.
Otha Wearin, 87, American politician, member of the U.S. House of Representatives (1933–1939).

4
Leonid Dushkin, 79, Soviet rocket scientist.
Mark Fradkin, 75, Soviet composer.
Hubert Ogunde, 73, Nigerian theatre manager.
Bernhard Rensch, 90, German evolutionary biologist.
Cyrus Rowlett Smith, 90, American businessman and politician, secretary of commerce (1968–1969), cardiac arrest.
Paul V. Yoder, 81, American musician.

5
Carsten Byhring, 71, Norwegian actor, cancer.
A. B. Masilamani, 75, Indian baptist pastor and evangelist.
Louis Nelson, 87, American trombonist, traffic collision.
Lev Skvirsky, 86, Soviet general.

6
Robert Abernathy, 65, American science fiction author.
Peter Doherty, 76, Northern Irish football player.
James MacNabb, 88, British Olympic rower (1924).
Joel de Oliveira Monteiro, 85, Brazilian footbal playler.
B. T. Ranadive, 85, Indian politician.
Yevgeny Savitsky, 79, Soviet fighter ace during World War II.
Alfred Sohn-Rethel, 91, French-German economist.
Zeydin Yusup, 26, Uyghur independence activist, killed in action.

7
J. Broward Culpepper, 82, American academic.
Ronald Evans, 56, American astronaut (Apollo 17), heart attack.
Kristian Gestrin, 60, Finnish judge and politician.
Dick Lundy, 82, American animator.
Arthur B. Singer, 72, American illustrator, esophageal cancer.

8
Emerson Greenaway, 83, American librarian.
Herman Jessor, 95, American architect.
Bill Kelly, 91, American baseball player.
Hans Korte, 90, German general.
J. Kenneth Robinson, 73, American politician, member of the U.S. House of Representatives (1971–1985), pancreatic cancer.
Bellan Roos, 88, Swedish actress.
Ernest Steward, 76-79, British cinematographer.
Ryan White, 18, American HIV/AIDS poster child, AIDS.
Zamazaan, 24-25, French Thoroughbred racehorse.

9
Aldo Bertocco, 78, Italian-French racing cyclist.
Jack Dermody, 79, Australian footballer.
John Henry Faulk, 76, American radio personality, cancer.
Yngve Lindegren, 77, Swedish football player.
James V. McConnell, 64, American zoologist, target of Ted Kaczynski.
Mikio Narita, 55, Japanese actor, linitis plastica.
Chips Sobek, 70, American basketball player.
Astrid Sommer, 83, Norwegian actress.

10
Margarete Adler, 94, Austrian Olympic swimmer and diver (1912, 1924).
Sir Hugh Trefusis Brassey, 74, British soldier and magistrate.
Fortune Gordien, 67, American Olympic discus thrower (1948, 1956).
Gerhard Schrader, 87, German chemist.

11
Harold Ballard, 86, Canadian sports executive.
Klaas Bolt, 63, Dutch organist.
Ronald Jasper, 72, British Anglican priest.
Ivar Lo-Johansson, 89, Swedish writer.
Margaret Carnegie Miller, 93, American heiress (Carnegie Corporation of New York).
Phyllis Munday, 95, Canadian mountaineer, explorer, and humanitarian.
Natalino Sapegno, 88, Literary critic and Italian academician.

12
John Brown, 74, New Zealand racing cyclist.
Geoffrey Harrison, 81, British diplomat.
Fuyuhiko Kitagawa, 89, Japanese poet and film critic.
Jef Lahaye, 57, Dutch racing cyclist.
Otto Neumann, 87, German Olympic runner (1928).
Johnny Reder, 80, Polish-American baseball player, heart disease.
Irving Terjesen, 75, American basketball player.
Luis Trenker, 97, Italian film producer, writer, actor, and Olympian.
Albert van Schendel, 77, Dutch racing cyclist.

13
Sundaram Balachander, 63, Indian musician and filmmaker, heart attack.
Ivan A. Elliott, 100, American lawyer and politician.
István Lovrics, 62, Hungarian basketball player.
Hans Reinerth, 89, German nazi archaeologist.
Ratomir Čabrić, 71, Yugoslav footballer.

14
Ahmed Balafrej, 81, Moroccan politician, prime minister (1958).
Mario Frustalupi, 47, Italian footballer, traffic collision.
Thurston Harris, 58, American singer, heart attack.
Martin Kessel, 89, German writer.
Alv Kjøs, 95, Norwegian politician.
Günther Krupkat, 84, German science fiction author.
Georges Lacombe, 87, French film director.
Flor Lambrechts, 80, Belgian footballer.
Doris Lusk, 73, New Zealand artist.
Olabisi Onabanjo, 63, Nigerian politician.
Marco Aurelio Robles, 84, Panamanian politician, president (1964–1968).
Sabicas, 78, Spanish guitarist, pneumonia.

15
Ulrich Becher, 80, German author.
Jock Bruce-Gardyne, 60, British politician, brain cancer.
Anna Carena, 91, Italian actress.
Greta Garbo, 84, Swedish-American actress (A Woman of Affairs, Anna Christie, Camille), pneumonia.
Helmut Lemke, 82, German politician.
Spark Matsunaga, 73, American politician, member of the U.S. Senate (since 1977), prostate cancer.
Lawson P. Ramage, 81, American naval admiral, cancer.

16
Peter J. Grant, 46-47, British ornithologist.
Slim Keith, 72, American socialite and fashion icon, lung cancer.
Stephen Shadegg, 80, American political consultant, cancer.
Mary Talbot, 86, American entomologist.

17
Ralph Abernathy, 64, American civil rights activist, blood clot.
Joseph E. Dillon, 69, American politician.
Joseph McMillan Johnson, 77, American art director, cerebral hemorrhage.
Jafta Masemola, 60, South African anti-apartheid activist, traffic collision.
Yuko Minamimura, 73, Japanese baseball player.
Karl Walz, 89, German politician.
Aubrey Williams, 63, Guyanese artist, cancer.

18
John Antonelli, 74, American baseball player.
Bob Drake, 70, American racing driver.
Gory Guerrero, 69, Mexican professional wrestler, liver failure.
Frédéric Rossif, 68, French film and television director.
Robert D. Webb, 87, American film director.

19
Dave Dexter, Jr., 74, American record producer.
Sergey Filippov, 77, Soviet and Russianactor and comedian, cancer.
John W. Schwada, 70, American academic.
Georgios Vikhos, 75, Greek Olympic sport shooter (1936, 1948).

20
Francis William Holbrooke Adams, 85, American lawyer and police commissioner.
N. H. Gibbs, 80, British academic.
Alex McCrindle, 78, Scottish actor.
George Reindorp, 78, British Anglican prelate.
Horst Sindermann, 74, East German politician.

21
Johnny Beazley, 71, American baseball player, cancer.
R. B. Braithwaite, 90, English philosopher and theologian.
Salvatore Cascino, 72, Italian Olympic racewalker (1948).
Erté, 97, Russian-born French artist.
Frank Lausche, 94, American politician, member of the U.S. Senate (1957–1969), governor of Ohio (1945–1947, 1949–1957), heart failure.
Tadeusz Parpan, 70, Polish soccer player.
Bogusław Psujek, 33, Polish marathon runner, fall.

22
Bob Davies, 70, American basketball player.
Bud Maxwell, 77, Scottish footballer.
Rosalind Moss, 99, British Egyptologist.
Albert Salmi, 62, American actor, murder-suicide.
Gustaf Wejnarth, 87, Swedish Olympic runner (1924).
Verda Welcome, 83, American politician.

23
Paulette Goddard, 79, American actress, heart failure.
Mason Ellsworth Hale, 61, American lichenologist.
Vincent Joseph Hines, 77, American Roman Catholic prelate.
Mary Turner Shaw, 84, Australian architect.
Charlie Wilson, 57, English career criminal (Great Train Robbery), shot.
Teodor Zaczyk, 90, Polish Olympic fencer (1936, 1948).

24
Vytautas Alantas, 87, Russian-American writer, journalist, and political ideologue.
Erik Eriksson, 75, Swedish footballer.
Endel Pärn, 76, Soviet actor and singer.
Kazem Rajavi, 56, Iranian human rights activist, shot.
Vladimir Saprykin, 73, Soviet Red Army officer and war hero .

25
Irving Fiske, 82, American playwright, stroke.
Dexter Gordon, 67, American jazz musician, kidney failure.
Rufus "Speedy" Jones, 53, American jazz drummer.
Fred Klein, 92, Dutch painter.
Bernard C. Schoenfeld, 82, American screenwriter.
Clifton Reginald Wharton, Sr., 90, American diplomat.

26
Józef Kosacki, 81, Polish professor, engineer, and inventor.
Carlos Pizarro Leongómez, 38, Colombian guerrilla leader, shot.
Wesley Rose, 72, American record producer.
John J. Winkler, 46, American philologist and Benedictine monk, AIDS.

27
Tita Duran, 61, Filipino actress.
Vladimir Kanygin, 41, Russian middleweight weightlifter.
Alyce Mills, 91, American actress.
Malwa Singh, 44, Indian wrestler.
Bella Spewack, 91, Romanian-born American playwright.
Vladimir Stoychev, 98, Bulgarian general and equestrian.
Earl Wilson, 84, American politician, member of the U.S. House of Representatives (1941–1959, 1961–1965).

28
Enrique Accorsi, 73, Chilean Olympic fencer (1948).
Edwina Dumm, 96-97, American cartoonist.
Peter Fuller, 42, British art critic, traffic collision.
Neil Watson, 84, New Zealand politician.

29
Enrique Almada, 55, Uruguayan actor and author, cancer.
Max Bense, 80, German philosopher.
Margaret Hance, 66, American politician, cancer.
Carl Hellmuth Hertz, 69, German physicist.
Sammy Lawhorn, 54, American blues guitarist.
Elise Constance Mourant, 68, New Zealand artist.
Ray Poat, 72, American baseball player.

30
Ernst Berndt, 74, Czechoslovak track and field athlete abd Olympian.
Ken Chisholm, 65, Scottish footballer.
Herbert Jankuhn, 84, German archaeologist.
Reidar Nyborg, 67, Norwegian Olympic skier (1948).
Angami Zapu Phizo, 85, Indian-British Naga nationalist.
Mario Pizziolo, 80, Italian footballer.
Joshua Prawer, 72, Polish-Israeli historian.
Paul Sears, 98, American ecologist.
Josef Velek, 50, Czechoslovak journalist, drowned.
Antoine Vitez, 59, French actor and theatre director.
Archie Wright, 65, Scottish football player.
Vasili Yermasov, 77, Soviet football player.
Mark Zborowski, 82, Soviet anthropologist and spy.

References 

1990-04
 04